The 25th Legislative Assembly of Quebec was the Quebec, Canada, provincial political legislature that existed from June 20, 1956, and June 22, 1960. The Union Nationale was the governing party for the fourth consecutive mandate. It was also Maurice Duplessis last term as Premier of Quebec. He died in office in 1959 and was succeeded in less than a year by Paul Sauvé and former cabinet Minister Antonio Barrette after Sauvé died less than four months after being sworn as Premier.

Seats per political party

 After the 1956 elections

Member list

This was the list of members of the Legislative Assembly of Quebec that were elected in the 1956 election:

Other elected MLAs

Other MLAs were elected in by-elections during this mandate

 Joseph-Maurice Laberge, Union Nationale, Chateauguay, September 18, 1957 
 Claude-Gilles Gosselin, Union Nationale, Compton, September 18, 1957 
 Joseph-Émile Fortin, Union Nationale, Mégantic, September 18, 1957 
 Loyola Schmidt, Union Nationale, Vaudreuil-Soulanges, September 18, 1957 
 Benoît Gaboury, Union Nationale, Matane, July 2, 1958 
 Pierre Bohémier, Union Nationale, Labelle, October 15, 1958 
 Jean-Joseph Turcotte, Union Nationale, Roberval, October 15, 1958 
 Fernand Lafontaine, Union Nationale, Labelle, September 16, 1959 
 Jean-Paul Levasseur, Union Nationale, Lac-Saint-Jean, September 16, 1959

Cabinet Ministers

Duplessis Cabinet (1956-1959)

 Prime Minister and Executive Council President: Maurice Duplessis
 Agriculture: Laurent Barrée
 Colonization: Joseph-Damase Begin
 Labour: Antonio Barrette
 Public Works: Roméo Lorrain
 Social Welfare and Youth: Paul Sauvé
 Health: Albiny Paquette (1956–1958), Arthur Leclerc (1958–1959)
 Lands and Forests: John Samuel Bourque (1956–1958), Jean-Jacques Bertrand (1958–1959)
 Hunting and Coastal Fisheries: Camille-Eugène Pouliot (1956–1958)
 Fisheries and Hunting: Camille-Eugene Pouliot (1958–1959)
 Mines: William McOuat Cottingham
 Hydraulic resources: John Samuel Bourque (1956–1958), Daniel Johnson Sr. (1958–1959)
 Roads: Antonio Talbot
 Transportation and Communications: Antoine Rivard
 Municipal Affairs: Yves Prevost (1956), Paul Dozois (1956–1959)
 Industry and Commerce: Jean-Paul Beaulieu
 Attorney General: Maurice Duplessis
 Provincial Secretary: Romeo Lorrain (1956), Yves Prevost (1956–1959)
 Solicitor General: Antoine Rivard
 Finances: Onésime Gagnon (1956), John Samuel Bourque (1958–1959)
 State Ministers: Gerard Thibeault (1958–1959)

Sauve Cabinet (1959-1960)

 Prime Minister and Executive Council President: Paul Sauve
 Agriculture: Laurent Barrée
 Colonization: Joseph-Damase Begin
 Labour: Antonio Barrette
 Public Works: Roméo Lorrain
 Social Welfare and Youth: Paul Sauvé
 Health: Arthur Leclerc
 Lands and Forests: Jean-Jacques Bertrand
 Fisheries and Hunting: Camille-Eugène Pouliot
 Mines: William McOuat Cottingham
 Hydraulic resources: Daniel Johnson Sr.
 Roads: Antonio Talbot
 Transportation and Communications: Antoine Rivard
 Municipal Affairs: Paul Dozois
 Industry and Commerce: Jean-Paul Beaulieu
 Attorney General: Antoine Rivard
 Provincial Secretary: Yves Prevost
 Solicitor General: Jacques Miquelon (1959–1960)
 Finances: John Samuel Bourque
 State Ministers: Gerard Thibeault, Antonio Elie, Maurice Bellemare, Wilfrid Labbe, Robert Bernard, Jacques Miquelon (1959)

Barrette Cabinet (1960)

 Prime Minister and Executive Council President: Antonio Barrette
 Agriculture: Laurent Barrée
 Colonization: Joseph-Damase Begin
 Labour: Antonio Barrette
 Public Works: Roméo Lorrain
 Social Welfare and Youth: Jean-Jacques Bertrand
 Health: Arthur Leclerc
 Lands and Forests: Jacques Miquelon
 Fisheries and Hunting: Camille-Eugène Pouliot
 Mines: William McOuat Cottingham
 Hydraulic resources: Daniel Johnson Sr.
 Roads: Antonio Talbot
 Transportation and Communications: Antoine Rivard
 Municipal Affairs: Paul Dozois
 Industry and Commerce: Jean-Paul Beaulieu
 Attorney General: Antoine Rivard
 Provincial Secretary: Yves Prévost
 Solicitor General: Jacques Miquelon
 Finances: John Samuel Bourque
 State Ministers: Gerard Thibeault, Antonio Élie, Maurice Bellemare, Wilfrid Labbe, Robert Bernard, Maurice-Tréfflé Custeau, Armand Maltais

New electoral districts

The electoral map was slightly modified in 1960 with the creation of the Duplessis riding from parts of Saguenay just before the elections later that year. In addition, Bourget was created from parts of Laval.

References
 1956 election results
 List of Historical Cabinet Ministers

25